Ángel Zucchi (born c. 1924) is a field hockey player who competed for Argentina at the 1948 Summer Olympics, he played in all three group games.

References

External links
 

Olympic field hockey players of Argentina
Argentine male field hockey players
Field hockey players at the 1948 Summer Olympics
1920s births
Possibly living people